The King's Avatar is a Chinese donghua web series aired in 2017, based on the web novel of the same name written by Hu Die lan. The series depicted the fictional esports scene in China where the story revolves around a multiplayer online video game called Glory. The series was produced by Chinese internet company Tencent. A 3-episode sequel premiered in 2018, and a long delayed second season aired in 2020. A prequel film, titled The King's Avatar: For the Glory, had a 2019 release.

Plot 
The King's Avatar follows the story of Ye Xiu, a professional esports player living in Hangzhou, China. Widely considered the best player of the video game Glory, Ye Xiu was captain of the esports team, "Excellent Era", holding the account of the 'Battle God', 'One Autumn Leaf' before being forced to resign from the team, giving up one of the strongest accounts in the game and leave the competitive scene due to his unwillingness to take part in any marketing to profit the team. Ye Xiu ends up finding work as a night-shift manager at Happy Internet Cafe, where he meets Chen Guo, the owner of the cafe whom happens to be a huge fan of his alias 'Ye Qiu', his former team and character 'One Autumn Leaf'. While awaiting his return to the competitive scene, Ye Xiu continues playing the game, building a character from scratch and pursuing the championship and glory.

Characters

Team Happy 
Ye Xiu (formerly in Team Excellent Era) 
Voiced by: Zhang Jie
Chen Guo 
Voiced by: Ji Guanlin
Su Mucheng (formerly in Team Excellent Era)
Voiced by: Tong Xinzhu (animation), Liu Xiaoyu (audio drama)
Tang Rou 
Voiced by: Qiao Shiyu
Bao Rongxing 
Voiced by: Teng Xin
Luo Ji 
Voiced by: Zhang Boheng
Qiao Yifan (formerly in Team Tiny Herb)
Voiced by: Su Shangqing
Wei Chen 
Voiced by: Feng Sheng (aka Tute Hameng)
An Wenyi 
Voiced by: Chenzhang Taikang
Mo Fan 
Voiced by: Zhang Fuzheng

Team Excellent Era 
Sun Xiang 
Voiced by: Liu Sanmu

Team Blue Rain  
Yu Wenzhou 
Voiced by: Xia Lei
Huang Shaotian 
Voiced by: Ye Qing

Team Tiny Herb 
Wang Jiexi 
Voiced by: Wei Chao
Gao Yingjie 
Voiced by: Shao Tong

Team Tyranny 
Han Wenqing 
Voiced by: Song Ming (aka Baomu Zhongyang)
Zhang Xinjie 
Voiced by: Bian Jiang (animation), Zhang Fuzheng (web series)

Team Samsara 
Zhou Zekai 
Voiced by: Jin Xian

Episode list
The first season aired from April to June 2017. A three-episode OVA sequel was released in May 2018. A prequel movie was released in August 2019 and a 2nd season aired from September to December 2020.

Series overview

Episodes

Season 1 (2017)

Specials

Season 2 (2020)

Awards and nominations

References 

2017 Chinese television series debuts
2017 esports television series
Chinese animated television series
Mandarin-language television shows
Television shows based on Chinese novels
Television series by Tencent Pictures